The Battle of Talikota, also known as that of Rakshasi–Tangadi, (23 January 1565) was a watershed battle fought between the Vijayanagara Empire and an alliance of the Deccan sultanates. The battle resulted in the defeat of Aliya Rama Raya which led to the eventual collapse of the polity and reconfigured Deccan politics. 

The specific details of the battle and its immediate aftermath are notoriously difficult to reconstruct in light of the distinctly contrarian narratives present across primary sources. Defeat is usually blamed on the gap in relative military prowess. Orientalist and nationalist historians asserted of the battle to be a clash of civilizations between Hindus and Muslims; Contemporary scholars reject such characterizations as flawed.

Background 
Rama Raya, after his installation of a patrimonial state and emerging as the ruler, adopted a political strategy of benefiting from the internecine warfare among the multiple successors of the Bahmani Sultanate, and it worked well for about twenty years of his reign.

However, after a series of aggressive efforts to maintain hold over Kalyan and diplomatic dealings with the Sultanates laden with insulting gestures, the four Muslim Sultanates – Hussain Nizam Shah I and Ali Adil Shah I of Ahmadnagar and Bijapur to the west, Ali Barid Shah I of Bidar in the center, and Ibrahim Quli Qutb Shah Wali of Golkonda to the east – united in the wake of shrewd marital diplomacy and convened to attack Aliya Rama Raya, in late January 1565.

Battle

Sources 
There exist multiple contemporary chronicles (literary as well as historical) documenting the war:

 Burhan-i Maasir by Sayyid Ali Bin Abdullah Tabataba, the court historian of Ahmadnagar Sultanate.
 Gulshan-i Ibrahimi by Ferishta, the court historian of Bijapur Sultanate.
 Taḏkerat al-molūk by Rafi-ud-Din Shirazi, another court historian of Bijapur Sultanate.
 Décadas da Ásia by official Portuguese record-keeper Diogo do Couto.
 Letters by Goa governor Dom Antão de Noronha.
 Fath-Nama-i Nizam Shah by Hasan Shauqi, a Dakhni poet.
Tarif-i Husayn Shah by Aftabi, a poet at Ahmadnagar court.

The details of the battle and immediate aftermath are often distinctly contrarian and even accounting for biases, reconstruction is difficult, if not impossible.

Description 
The exact venue of clash has been variously mentioned as Talikota, Rakkasagi-Tangadigi and Bannihatti, all on the banks of river Krishna. There exists debate as to the precise dates. Span-lengths vary from hours to days; descriptions of battle formations and maneuvers vary too.

Outcome

Rama Raya was eventually beheaded either by Sultan Nizam Hussain himself or by someone else acting on his behest despite Adil Shah, who had friendly relations with Raya, intending against. In the resultant confusion and havoc, Raya's brother Tirumala deserted with the entire army; he did try to regroup in Vijaynagara but failed and moved to the outskirts. His other brother Venkatadri was blinded and likely, killed in action.

Aftermath 

The Sultanates' armies went on to plunder Vijayanagara, unopposed. Popular accounts and older scholarship describe Vijayanagara falling to ruins, in light of the widespread desecration of sacred topography; however, this view has been contested. Contemporary historians and archaeologists warn against conflating the state with the town as little evidence exists about any damage inflicted beyond the Royal Center; they further emphasize about the politically strategic nature of destruction and arson, since sites associated with sovereignty, royal power, and authority were subject to more wanton means.

Nonetheless, the battle caused a political rupture for the state of Vijayanagara and permanently reconfigured Deccan politics. Patronage of monuments and temples ceased, the Vaishnava cult perished, and the Royal Center was never rebuilt. The Bijapur Sultanate reaped maximum gains but their alliance did not last long. Tirumala went on to establish the Aravidu dynasty, which held sway over fragments of the erstwhile empire and even operated out of Vijayanagara for two years, before shifting to Pengonda. But faced with successional disputes, rebellions by multiple local chieftains—primarily Telugu Nayak houses—who did not wish for the reemergence of any central authority, and continuous conflicts with the Bijapur Sultanate—who might have been invited by Rama Raya's son—, it moved southwards before disintegrating in the late 1640s.

Legacy

Analysis of defeat 
Vijayanagara side was winning the war, state Hermann Kulke and Dietmar Rothermund in a survey of Indian history, until two Muslim generals of the Vijayanagara army switched sides. Many scholars however reject this account of treachery as a post-battle speculation by Venetian merchant Cesare de Federici in Viaggi, which would be taken up by a section of nationalist historians in their quest to identify traitors upon whom the responsibility of any and all Hindu defeats can be entrusted; a gulf of difference in military prowess—primarily stemming from a failure to incorporate gunpowder technology—is instead noted as the primary factor.

Clash of civilizations 
Colonial era historians (Robert Sewell, Jonathan Scott et al) drawing from the accounts of Firishta and later, nationalist historians (Aluru Venkata Rao, B. A. Saletore, S. Krishnaswami Aiyangar, K. A. Nilakanta Sastri et al) lensed the battle as a Clash of Civilizations wherein the "Ramrajya" of Vijayanagara, a "Hindu bulwark" state  fell to "Muhammedan" conquests driven by religious bigotry. 

Richard M. Eaton rejects that there were any religious motives behind the battle and described of the civilization-hypothesis as orientalist scholarship, which ignored the multiple alliances of Rama Raya with different Muslim rulers at different spans of time (in tune to his political strategy), the thorough perfusion of Persian Islamate culture with Vijaynagara Kingdom, as evident from court-sanctioned art, architecture and culture, and strategic alliances of Rama Raya's heirs (Aravidus) with heirs of the Deccan Sultans. Romila Thapar, Burton Stein, Sanjay Subrahmanyam, Muzaffar Alam, Stewart N. Gordon and other scholars agree on the basis of similar analyses; additional arguments include that the Berar Sultanate did not join the battle and that the Sultanate-alliance dissipated soon enough. Harmonious Hindu-Muslim relations in the empire has been documented and there were high placed Muslims in Vijaynagara Court.

Popular culture 
The battle has been adopted into a play by Girish Karnad, who based it on Eaton's analysis.

See also
War of the League of the Indies

Notes

References

1565 in India
Battles involving the Vijayanagara Empire
Islamic rule in the Indian subcontinent
History of Karnataka
History of Andhra Pradesh
Conflicts in 1565
Deccan sultanates
Battles involving the Deccan Sultanates